Loricariichthys castaneus, the Cascudo-viola is a species of catfish in the family Loricariidae. It is endemic to Brazil, where it occurs in coastal streams in southeastern part of the country, ranging from São Paulo to Espírito Santo, including the Paraíba do Sul basin. The species reaches  in total length and is believed to be a facultative air-breather.

References 

Loricariini
Fish described in 1855
Endemic fauna of Brazil